The Mattwaldhorn is a mountain of the Swiss Pennine Alps, located between the upper Nanztal and the Saastal in the canton of Valais. The nearest locality is Eisten on the west side.

References

External links
 Mattwaldhorn on Hikr

Mountains of the Alps
Alpine three-thousanders
Mountains of Switzerland
Mountains of Valais